The Art Rooney Award is given annually by the National Football League (NFL) in recognition of outstanding sportsmanship on the playing field. Established in 2015, the award is named in honor of Art Rooney, the founding owner of the Pittsburgh Steelers and a member of the Pro Football Hall of Fame.

The award is determined by a vote of the NFL players. The award is presented each year to an NFL player who demonstrates on the field the qualities of great sportsmanship, including fair play, respect for opponents, and integrity in competition.

Each NFL team nominates one player during the season. A panel of former players from the NFL Legends Community selected from the 32 nominees eight finalists (four in the American Football Conference; four in the National Football Conference). The panel of Legends Coordinators in the inaugural year was composed of Warrick Dunn, Curtis Martin, Karl Mecklenburg and Leonard Wheeler. Along with the award, the winner receives a $25,000 donation from the NFL Foundation to a charity of his choice.

Award winners

See also
 List of National Football League awards

References

National Football League trophies and awards
Sportsmanship trophies and awards